Extraordinary Measures is a 2010 American medical drama film starring Brendan Fraser, Harrison Ford, and Keri Russell. It was the first film produced by CBS Films, the film division of CBS Corporation, who released the film on January 22, 2010. The film is about parents who form a biotechnology company to develop a drug to save the lives of their children, who have a life-threatening disease. The film is based on the true story of John and Aileen Crowley, whose children have Pompe's disease. The film was shot in St. Paul, Oregon; Portland, Oregon; Tualatin, Oregon; Wilsonville, Oregon; Manzanita, Oregon; Beaverton, Oregon, and Vancouver, Washington.

Plot
John Crowley and his wife Aileen are a Portland couple with two of their three children suffering from Pompe disease, a genetic anomaly that typically kills most children before their tenth birthdays. John, an advertising executive, contacts Robert Stonehill, a researcher in Nebraska who has done innovative research for an enzyme treatment for the rare disease. John and Aileen raise money to help Stonehill's research and the required clinical trials. 

John takes on the task full-time to save his children's lives, launching a biotechnology research company working with venture capitalists and then rival teams of researchers. This task proves very daunting for Stonehill, who already works around the clock. As time is running short, Stonehill's angry outburst hinders the company's faith in him, and the profit motive may upend John's hopes. The researchers race against time to save the children who have the disease.

Cast 
 Brendan Fraser as John Crowley
 Harrison Ford as Dr. Robert Stonehill
 Keri Russell as Aileen Crowley
 Courtney B. Vance as Marcus Temple
 Meredith Droeger as Megan Crowley
 Diego Velazquez as Patrick Crowley
 Sam M. Hall as John Crowley, Jr.
 Patrick Bauchau as Eric Loring
 Jared Harris as Dr. Kent Webber
 Alan Ruck as Pete Sutphen
 David Clennon as Dr. Renzler
 Dee Wallace as Sal
 Ayanna Berkshire as Wendy Temple
 P. J. Byrne as Dr. Preston
 Andrea White as Dr. Allegria
 G. J. Echternkamp as Niles
 Vu Pham as Vinh Tran
 Derek Webster as Cal Dunning

John Crowley makes a cameo appearance as a venture capitalist.

Production
 
Adapted by Robert Nelson Jacobs from the nonfiction book The Cure: How a Father Raised $100 Million—and Bucked the Medical Establishment—in a Quest to Save His Children by the Pulitzer Prize journalist Geeta Anand, the film is also an examination of how medical research is conducted and financed.

Filming took place at several spots in and around Portland, Oregon, mostly at the OHSU Doernbecher Children's Hospital, Veterans Affairs Medical Center and the Nike campus in Beaverton, Oregon.  This was the first time Nike allowed filming on their campus and they donated the location payment to Doernbecher Children’s Hospital. During filming, the working title was The Untitled Crowley Project.

In the film, the children are 9 and 7 years old. Their non-fiction counterparts were diagnosed at 15 months and 7 days old and received treatment at 5 and 4, respectively.

Inspiration
Myozyme, a drug developed for treating Pompe disease, was simultaneously approved for sale by the US Food and Drug Administration and the European Medicines Agency. Henceforth, more than 1000 infants born worldwide every year with Pompe disease will no longer face the prospect of death before reaching their first birthday for lack of a treatment for the condition.

The screenplay by Robert Nelson Jacobs is based on Geeta Anand's book The Cure.  Parts of the book first appeared as a series of articles in The Wall Street Journal.

The small start-up company Priozyme was based on Oklahoma City-based Novazyme. The larger company, called Zymagen in the film, was based on Genzyme in Cambridge, Massachusetts. Novazyme was developing a protein therapeutic, with several biological patents pending, to treat Pompe Disease, when it was bought by Genzyme. The patent portfolio was cited in the press releases announcing the deal.

Genzyme claims that Dr. Robert Stonehill's character is based upon scientist and researcher William Canfield, who founded Novazyme. According to Roger Ebert's review, the character is based on Yuan-Tsong Chen, a scientist and researcher from Duke University who collaborated with Genzyme in producing Myozyme, the drug which received FDA approval.

Reception

Critical response
Review aggregation website Rotten Tomatoes gives the film an approval rating of 29% based on reviews from 142 critics and an average rating of 4.88 out of 10. The site's general consensus is, "Despite a timely topic and a pair of heavyweight leads, Extraordinary Measures never feels like much more than a made-for-TV tearjerker." Metacritic, which assigns a weighted average score out of 0–100 reviews from film critics, has a rating score of 45 based on 33 reviews. Audiences polled by CinemaScore gave the film an average grade of "A-" on an A+ to F scale.

Richard Corliss of Time magazine wrote: "Fraser keeps the story anchored in reality. Meredith Droeger does too: as the Crowleys' afflicted daughter, she's a smart little bundle of fighting spirit. So is the movie, which keeps its head while digging into your heart. You have this critic's permission to cry in public." The New York Times A. O. Scott said in his review: "The startling thing about Extraordinary Measures is not that it moves you. It's that you feel, at the end, that you have learned something about the way the world works."

Ramona Bates MD, writing for the health news organisation, EmaxHealth, stated that the film brings attention to Pompe disease. Peter Rainer from The Christian Science Monitor mentions that Big Pharma got a surprisingly free pass in the film and that it will come as a surprise to all those sufferers struggling to get orphan drugs developed.

Jef Akst, writing for the journal The Scientist, stated that the film is good depiction of the "hard to swallow fiscal issues of drug development."

Box office
The film opened at #8 on its opening weekend, taking in $6 million. The film remained in theaters for four weeks, earning $12 million.

References

External links
 
 
 
 
 

2010 films
2010 drama films
American drama films
CBS Films films
Films based on non-fiction books
Films directed by Tom Vaughan (director)
Films set in Portland, Oregon
Films shot in Oregon
Films shot in Washington (state)
Films with screenplays by Robert Nelson Jacobs
Medical-themed films
2010s English-language films
2010s American films